Cascatelli  are a short pasta shape with a flat strip and a pair of ruffles parallel to each other, each of which sticks out at a 90-degree angle from the strip. The ruffles give the shape texture and create a "sauce trough" that holds sauce. 

This modern pasta shape was developed in the 2010s by American food podcaster Dan Pashman. The shape is a hybrid of the bucatini and mafalda pasta types, highlighting the half-tube components and ribbon-shaped ruffle pasta respectively, and was designed to meet Pashman's preferred characteristics in a pasta shape.

Name 
The name comes from the Italian cascate meaning "waterfalls", while cascatelle means "little waterfalls". Pashman decided to end it with -elli to sound like more traditional Italian pasta names that often end with the masculine plural diminutive suffixes -ini, -elli, -illi, -etti to convey the sense of "little". While acknowledging that the correct Italian spelling for the plural of waterfall is cascatelle, he argued "I think we can take some poetic license. If we end it with an i, cascatelli, it sounds more like a pasta name". The name 'cascatelli' received trademark protection in the United States for use in association with pasta in March 2021. Other potential names had included Italian variations on ridged dinosaurs, millipedes or the musical bass clef.

History 
Dan Pashman, host of The Sporkful podcast, decided to make a new "ideal" pasta shape that needed to have the perfect bite, an appealing texture, and hold the right amount of sauce. The American pasta company Sfoglini worked with Pashman to produce the product.

Pashman coined terms to describe the three qualities to talk about pasta shapes:
 "Forkability" - how easy it is to get a pasta shape on your fork and keep it there
 "Sauceability" - how well a sauce sticks to it
 "Toothsinkability" - how satisfying it is to sink your teeth into

The pasta was officially released in 2021, after a three-year research and development process. That process is documented in The Sporkful podcast series "Mission: ImPASTAble".

In February 2022, the US pasta company Banza began selling cascatelli made using chickpea flour, suitable for gluten-free diets.

Composition and use 

Cascatelli are a half-tubed pasta made of hard durum wheat flour and water, or semolina. The suggested cook time is 13–17 minutes.

Sfoglini's self-claimed perfect ragù companion for cascatelli is pancetta and red pepper flakes, similar to the classic Roman sauce amatriciana, with ground pork, onion, carrots, and celery which make it more Bolognese.
This is similar to the parent pasta, bucatini, which in Italian cuisine is commonly served with amatriciana sauce.

See also

 Bucatini
 Mafaldine
 List of pasta

References

External links
 Cascatelli product page at Sfoglini.com

Types of pasta